Pee or PEE may refer to:
Slang for Urine
Slang for Urination
P, the 16th letter of the English alphabet
Peeblesshire, historic county in Scotland, Chapman code
Penny or pence
Pochonbo Electronic Ensemble, a North Korean electronica group
"Pee" (South Park), an episode of South Park
Perm International Airport, or Bolshoye Savino Airport, IATA code PEE

See also
 Peepee (disambiguation)